Bullock Brook is a river in Delaware County, New York. It flows into Trout Creek south of the hamlet of Trout Creek.

References

Rivers of New York (state)
Rivers of Delaware County, New York